The Boyne River is a river in the municipality of Lake of Bays, District Municipality of Muskoka in Central Ontario, Canada. It is part of the Great Lakes Basin, and flows from Fowler Lake to its mouth at Dwight Bay on the Lake of Bays near the community of Dwight on Ontario Highway 60. The Lake of Bays flows via the Muskoka River, then the Moon River and Musquash River to Georgian Bay on Lake Huron.

Tributaries
Sixteen Mile Creek (left)

References

Sources

Rivers of Muskoka District